Pixl may refer to:

 Pixl, a character in Super Paper Mario
 PixL, an American cable television network
 PiXL, a vision correction procedure
 PIXL, acronym for Planetary Instrument for X-Ray Lithochemistry, an instrument on the Perseverance Mars rover

See also 
 Pixel (disambiguation)